Victoria-Swan Lake is a provincial electoral district in British Columbia, Canada established by the Electoral Districts Act, 2008.  It was first contested in the 2009 election, in which New Democrat, Rob Fleming was elected its first MLA.

Geography
Victoria-Swan Lake makes up the northern portions of Victoria and the southern portions of Saanich.  The Victoria section, north of Bay Street, consists of the neighbourhoods of Burnside-Gorge, Hillside-Quadra, and Oaklands.  In Saanich, the electoral district covers Tillicum-Gorge, Uptown, and Quadra-Cedar Hill.

MLAs

Electoral history

External links
 2013 Statement of Votes - Victoria-Swan Lake
 BC Elections Statement of Votes - Victoria-Swan Lake

References

British Columbia provincial electoral districts on Vancouver Island
Politics of Victoria, British Columbia
Saanich, British Columbia